Iwate 3rd district is a constituency of the House of Representatives in the Diet of Japan (national legislature). It is located in Iwate.

Ichirō Ozawa of the Liberal Party took the seat in the constituency after his original seat in the Iwate 4th district was abolished in the 2017 general election. Previously, the seat was held by Toru Kikawada of the Democratic Party (DPJ) since 2000.

List of representatives

References 

Districts of the House of Representatives (Japan)